The St. Botolph Club is a private social club in Boston, Massachusetts, founded in 1880 by a group including many artists.  Its name is derived from the English saint Botwulf of Thorney.

Among the club's other activities in its quarters at 2 Newbury Street, it hosted an extensive and long-running series of fine arts exhibits, particularly new work from painters of the American Impressionists:  Dennis Miller Bunker, Dodge MacKnight, Joseph Thurman Pearson Jr. (in a 1912 dual exhibition with animalier sculptor Albert Laessle) and Willard Metcalf, who first showed his landscape May Night at the club in 1906.  The club also exhibited work by Wilton Lockwood, Adelaide Cole Chase, Frances C. Houston, and the sculptor Bela Pratt.

Among its members were the architect Charles Follen McKim and Boston composer Frederick Converse.

Originally exclusively a men's club, the St. Botolph Club has been open to women since 1988 in advance of a Supreme Court ruling against sexual and racial discrimination in social clubs that would have mandated it.

The club appeared in fictionalized form as the "St. Filipe Club" in two novels written by Arlo Bates, The Pagans (1884) and The Philistines (1888).

Since 1972 at 199 Commonwealth Avenue, the club maintains reciprocal relationships with a large number of social clubs worldwide.

See also
List of American gentlemen's clubs

References

External links 
Official website

1880 establishments in Massachusetts
Clubs and societies in Boston
Gentlemen's clubs in the United States
Organizations established in 1880